The Snake and the Stallion, also known as Cobra Ferrari Wars, documents the legendary rivalry between Texas chicken farmer turned American car producer Carroll Shelby and the Italian automotive entrepreneur Enzo Ferrari.

Release
The Snake and the Stallion aired on the BBC on Monday 17 June 2002 and was subsequently released on DVD. A remastered collector's edition of the film was released on DVD in 2008.

Synopsis
Richard Symons's documentary recounts the origins and rise to racing history of the AC Cobra, the car requested by Carroll Shelby. The film details the history of the Cobra and Carroll Shelby's racing career from its humble beginnings to the 1959 victory at the 24 Hours of Le Mans with Roy Salvadori at the wheel of an Aston Martin DBR1. The story goes on to explain Shelby's motivation to take on the might of Ferrari with the help of Ford and AC of England (who were then manufacturing invalid carriages as well as sports cars) and why Carroll Shelby had to retire from racing.

Carroll Shelby was closely involved in the making of the documentary, stating "I spent a whole lot of time with Richard on this and he’s really nailed it. Got all the right people, from Dan Gurney to Lee Iacocca. It’s a wonderful story and I’ve never seen anybody tell it better. I’m very proud to have been part of it."

See also
Ford vs. Ferrari

References 
 Classic Driver

External links 
 
 Spirit Level Film
 BBC listing

2002 television films
2002 films
British auto racing films
Documentary films about auto racing
Ferrari
2000s English-language films
Enzo Ferrari
British sports documentary films
2000s British films